Peter Ryan is an Australian former professional rugby league footballer who played as a  in the 1950s and 1960s. He played for the Newtown and Parramatta in the NSWRL premiership. Ryan is the father of Canterbury, Newtown and Eastern Suburbs player Mick Ryan.

Playing career
Ryan was born in Ipswich, Queensland but moved down to Sydney at a young age and played his junior rugby league in the Newtown area before being graded by the club in 1953.  In 1954, Ryan was part of the Newtown side which claimed the minor premiership and made the grand final that year against South Sydney.  Newtown lost the final 23-15.  In 1955, Newtown again claimed the minor premiership and the club qualified for their second consecutive grand final against the same opponent.  In the 1955 Grand final, Newtown lead Souths 8-4 at halftime before Souths came back to win 12-11.  This would be Newtown's last grand final for the next 26 years before making the 1981 decider.

Ryan stayed with Newtown until the end of 1959 before leaving to become captain-coach for Mareeba in far North Queensland.  In 1961, Ryan moved back to Sydney and joined perennial strugglers Parramatta and in his first year the club finished last on the table.  In his final year as a player, Parramatta finished 4th on the table and qualified for the finals.  Ryan did not feature in the club's 6-0 finals loss to Western Suburbs.

References

Australian rugby league players
Newtown Jets players
Parramatta Eels players
Year of birth missing
Rugby league locks
Rugby league players from Ipswich, Queensland